The Reckoning is a non-fiction book written by David Halberstam and published in 1986. He spent five years researching and writing it.

It is the third and final book of his trilogy study of the forces of power in America, after The Best and the Brightest and The Powers That Be, and has been described as "a parallel history and study of the American and Japanese automobile industries, using Nissan and Ford Motors as examples".

References

Further reading

External links
Interview with Halberstam on The Reckoning, October 1, 1987, C-SPAN
 online copy of book--free to borrow

1986 non-fiction books
Books by David Halberstam
Nissan
Ford Motor Company
Books about multinational companies
Books about Detroit
William Morrow and Company books
Japan–United States relations